Quinta del Cedro is a city in Baja California, located in Tijuana Municipality. The city had a population of 5,704 as of 2010.

References

Populated places in Tijuana Municipality